Cochylidia implicitana, the chamomile conch, is a moth of the family Tortricidae. It was described by Wocke in 1856. It is found in most of Europe, except Ireland and most of the Balkan Peninsula. Outside of Europe, it is found in Morocco, the Alatau mountains in Central Asia, Iran and China (Xinjiang). The habitat consists of waste ground and verges.

Adults are on wing from May to August in one generation per year.

The larvae feed on a wide range of plants, including Artemisia campestris, Matricaria, Aster, Anthemis, Solidago, Chrysanthemum, Alchemilla, Helichrysum and Tanacetum species. The larvae have been recorded feeding on the flowers and seeds of their host plant, but may also live in the stems and shoots, feeding on the pith.

References

Cochylini
Moths described in 1856
Moths of Asia
Moths of Europe
Taxa named by Maximilian Ferdinand Wocke